Joseph Patrick Burke (31 January 1923 - 26 June 2005) was a former Irish cricketer. A right-handed batsman and right-arm fast-medium bowler, he made his debut for Ireland in a match against Lancashire in May 1954. He played for Ireland six times in total, his last match coming against the MCC in September 1958. Of these games, three had first-class status.

References
CricketEurope Stats Zone profile

1923 births
2005 deaths
Irish cricketers
Cricketers from County Dublin